A list of the films produced in Mexico in 1940 (see 1940 in film):

1940

External links

1940
Films
Mexican